North Carolina Highway 690 (NC 690) is a primary state highway in the U.S. state of North Carolina.  The highway runs east–west, connecting the cities of Vass and Spring Lake.

Route description

NC 690 is a  two-lane rural highway that begins in Vass and ends near Spring Lake.

History

Established in 1999 as a new primary route, it has not changed since then.

Junction list

References

690
Transportation in Moore County, North Carolina
Transportation in Cumberland County, North Carolina